The Supermarine Type 179 "Giant" was a British monoplane flying boat developed by Supermarine but cancelled before completion.

Design and development
The Type 179 was an all-metal monoplane flying-boat powered by six Rolls-Royce Buzzard piston engines mounted above the wing. It was to have a crew of seven and room for 40 passengers in a day configuration. The keel was laid down in 1931 and the aircraft was under construction when the project was abandoned in 1932. The aircraft had been registered G-ABLE in April 1931.

Specifications (Type 179 estimated at July 1931)

See also

References

External links
 Supermarine Type 179 from Avia Deja Vu

Flying boats
1930s British airliners
179
Abandoned civil aircraft projects of the United Kingdom
Six-engined push-pull aircraft
High-wing aircraft